Morgan House is a historic home located in Pasquotank County, North Carolina. It was built circa 1826 for Samuel Holstead, and is a two-story, three bay, Federal style, temple-form frame dwelling.  It sits on a brick pier foundation, with a three-part form-a central section flanked by porches. The front facade features a "dwarf portico" supported by two pairs of vernacular Doric order columns that carry an arched central bay.

It was listed on the National Register of Historic Places in 1972.

References

Houses on the National Register of Historic Places in North Carolina
Federal architecture in North Carolina
Houses completed in 1826
Houses in Pasquotank County, North Carolina
National Register of Historic Places in Pasquotank County, North Carolina
1826 establishments in North Carolina